Elaeocarpus ferrugineus is a species of flowering plant in the Elaeocarpaceae family. It is a tree endemic to Peninsular Malaysia.

References

ferrugineus
Endemic flora of Peninsular Malaysia
Trees of Peninsular Malaysia
Plants described in 1840
Taxa named by William Jack (botanist)
Taxonomy articles created by Polbot
Taxobox binomials not recognized by IUCN